Lawazantiya  was the cultic city of the goddess Šauška. It is mentioned in Old-Assyrian documents as Luhuzantiya. In Hittite texts the city is known as Lawazantiya (also: Lahuwazantiya, Lauwanzantiya or Lahuzzandiya), in Ugarit as Lwsnd and in Assyrian Annals as Lusanda. There is a Hittite document entitled "Festival of Teššub and Ḫebat of Lawazantiya" which has the king calling these deities in to open the spring festival. Hittite ruler Hattušili III met his future queen, Pudu-Hebain, in Lawazantiya. She is known to have been a strong promoter of Kizzuwatnean cults and traditions and was a daughter of Pentipšarri, a priest of Šauška. In the Telipinu Edict that Hittite ruler (c. 1525-1500 BC) reports that the city had rebelled and been retaken.

Location
The city is known to have been part of the Kizzuwatna region. The earliest mention of the city comes from the Old Assyrian documents as a trading colony in Kaniš, where the place Luḫuzatia is often mentioned, which is common to Lawazantiya. Gojko Barjamovic considers Luḫuzatia and Lawazantiya to be two separate localities, with the former locating in Elbistan. Meanwhile Lawazantiya might be located at Sirkeli Höyük. Tatarli Höyük has also been proposed as the location based on cylinder and stamp seals found at that site.

References

Hittite cities
Lost ancient cities and towns